I'm Almost Not Crazy: John Cassavetes, the Man and His Work is a 1989 documentary directed by Michael Ventura and starring John Cassavetes.

Overview
Filmed in 1984, the filmmakers document Cassavetes during the making of Love Streams, the last film he both wrote and directed. Originally released following Cassavetes' death in 1989, the documentary is featured on the 2014 Criterion release of the film.

References

External links

1984 films
1989 films
1989 documentary films
Documentary films about film directors and producers
American independent films
Documentary films about films
John Cassavetes
Documentary films about the cinema of the United States
Golan-Globus films
Films produced by Menahem Golan
Films produced by Yoram Globus
1980s English-language films
1980s American films